Deh Reza or Deh-e Reza may refer to various places in Iran:
 Deh-e Reza, Rigan, Kerman Province
 Deh Reza, Markazi
 Deh-e Reza, Mirjaveh, Sistan and Baluchestan Province
 Deh Reza, South Khorasan